"Ride on the Rhythm", is a song recorded by American DJ and record producer Little Louie Vega, released on August 13, 1991, by Atlantic Records. It features American singer Marc Anthony when he was still a freestyle musician.

Legacy
This house classic would help establish the successful careers of Vega and partner Kenny "Dope" Gonzalez, who would later become more famous as Masters at Work, and for Marc Anthony, who picked up his first number one single on the Billboard Hot Dance Club Play chart. The track also featured backing rap vocals from Doug Lazy, Todd Terry on keyboards and co-production, The Basement Boys (the production team behind Crystal Waters and Ultra Naté) on piano and Luis Vega, Sr. on saxophone. This would also be the last single that Marc Anthony worked under freestyle genre before he signed on with RMM to start his career as a salsero singer.

Track listings
 12" vinyl (US promo, 1991)
A1. "Ride on the Rhythm" (Kenlou Rhythm Mix) – (7:08)
A2. "Ride on the Rhythm" (Radio Mix Funky) – (4:05)
B1. "Ride on the Rhythm" (Masters At Work Dub) – (6:16)
B2. "Ride on the Rhythm" (The Ride) – (6:39)
B3. "Ride on the Rhythm" (A cappella) – (0:30)

 12" maxi CD (US, 1992)
1. "Ride on the Rhythm" (Radio Mix Funky) – (4:06)
2. "Ride on the Rhythm" (Funky '92 Re-Edit) – (7:25)
3. "Ride on the Rhythm" (Kenlou Rhythm Mix) – (7:09)
4. "The Masters at Work" (One Take Tito Mix) – (5:11)

Chart performance
The single reached number one on the Billboard Hot Dance Club Play chart in the United States during the week ending October 5, 1991 and stayed there for only one week.

Reception
John Bush of AllMusic felt the song was worth the cost of the album and calling it a "effortless dancefloor stormer".

See also
List of number-one dance singles of 1991 (U.S.)

References

External links
Track listing at Discogs
track featured on YouTube

1991 singles
1991 songs
Little Louie Vega songs
Marc Anthony songs
Todd Terry songs
Atlantic Records singles
Songs about music